Cephonodes titan is a moth of the  family Sphingidae. It is known from Ambon.

It is the largest species of the genus Cephonodes. The upperside of the head, thorax, abdomen and wing bases is black. The underside of the thorax is orange, while the underside of the wing bases and abdomen is black. The anal tuft is brownish-orange.

References

Cephonodes
Moths described in 1899